The Utva Lasta 95 is a light military trainer aircraft produced by Utva Aviation Industry, subsidiary of Yugoimport SDPR. It is a tandem two-seater low-wing trainer with a metal airframe. The aircraft is capable of basic training functions including aerobatics, instrument and tactical flying, as well as basic training in use of weapons. The first prototype of Lasta 1 flew on 2 September 1985, while the first prototype of the current version, Lasta 3, flew on February 26, 2009. Lasta is the Serbian word for barn swallow.

Design and development

The Lasta was originally developed to be a replacement of the Utva 75 and, partially, Soko G-2 Galeb, which had been the most commonly used trainer aircraft of the Yugoslav Air Force up until 1991. The first prototype Lasta 1 was completed by the spring of 1985. Following completion of the initial testing phase, the first flight was achieved on September 2, 1985. In January 1989, design of a modified version – Lasta 2 was started, following changes in Yugoslav Air Force requirements. Lasta 2 was lighter, with shorter fuselage and a new electronics system including fire control Ferranti ISIS D-282. By the early 1990s Utva, and her partners, have produced enough parts for the completion of 10 pre-production airframes. During the 1999 NATO bombing of Yugoslavia, all five existing prototypes were destroyed during the bombing of Utva Aviation Industry (a sixth prototype survived with damage and was donated to the Aviation Museum at Belgrade Nikola Tesla Airport).

In 2006 development of the Lasta was restarted. The new version was known as the Lasta 95 and followed basic concepts of Lasta 2, with updates due to newer available technology. In 2009 it was announced that Iraq will purchase 20 of these trainer aircraft.

With its specifications and updated avionics, the aircraft will ensure full pilot training for all elements of airplane application including:
 basic flying,
 aerobatics,
 navigation flying,
 basic elements of night flying,
 category II instrumental flight,
 basic elements of gunning, rocketing and bombing (GRB)
 Light close air support of counterinsurgency operations and area patrol / light attack missions

Future improvements and developments
It is possible to install ejection seats, but with higher cost and weight of the airplane. It is also possible that new containers with armaments and sensors would be developed for Lasta 95, as well as a proposed turboprop version of the aircraft with more advanced training and combat capabilities.

Operational history
In December 2007, the Iraqi Air Force ordered 36 (20 firm with an option for 16 units) Lasta 95 aircraft. The first Lasta 95s were transferred to Iraq on August 5, 2010. Last of the 20 ordered Lasta 95 aircraft arrived in February 2012. According to media reports, the aircraft have been used during the Iraqi war against ISIL.

By March 2012, two of 15 ordered Lasta 95 aircraft began service with the Serbian Air Force.

Variants
There are three-factory versions of Lasta 95.

Lasta 95N

This light piston-propeller training aircraft is primarily intended for initial and basic training of military pilots. With in-line tandem seating, the trainer was developed in accordance with the Federal Aviation Regulations (Joint Aviation Requirements) 23 regulations for acrobatic category of airplanes and it provides an easy transition to Kobac and then to jet at higher training levels. The LASTA is equipped with a six-cylinder 224 kW (300 HP) engine of the opposed-cylinder type, and a two-bladed metal propeller Hartzell HC-C2YR-4CF/FC 8475-6, which provides maximum flight velocity (at an altitude of 3000m and a takeoff weight of 1085 kg) of 345 km/h. The empty weight is 888 kg, and the maximum takeoff weight is 1210 kg for the aerobatic category and 1450 kg for the utility (armed) category. The total aircraft length is 7.97m. The trapezoidal wings have a wingspan of 9.7 m and a surface of 12.9 m2. The altitude barrier of flight is 6000 m. This propeller-driven low-wing aircraft has a tricycle retractable landing gear suitable for rough-field operations. Onboard GPS and Instrument Landing System (ILS) support the operations during CAT-II weather conditions. The aircraft is equipped with Mode S transponder for flight identification. Besides for training purposes, it can be used for combat fire training, rocket firing and bombing. The armed version of the LASTA 95 can be equipped with 7.62 mm or 12.7 mm machine guns, 57 mm rocket launchers or bombs weighing up to 120 kg on two hardpoints.

Lasta 95V-54

Lasta 95V-54 designation is for Serbian Air Force and Air Defence. Differences between Lasta 95N and Lats 95V-54 are in following:
 Engine Lycoming AEIO-580-B1A, with 315 hp (332 kW, under H = 0 and 2700 rpm)
 Two-blade metal propeller HARTZELL HC-C2YR-4CF/FC 8475-8
 New propeller cap
 Modified primary flight controls
 Modified engine controls with less friction
 New instruments for measuring temperatures and oil pressure and temperatures of cylinder block and exhaust gases in both cabins
 New radio stations Bendix/King for UHF with antennas
 New gun sight AKN-09 Teleoptik Zemun which supports containers with Machine gun, bombs and unguided rocket launcher
 Two under-wing hard points for weapons max allowed 120 kg
 New glass cockpit with Garmin G500 avionics suites, which includes a primary flight display (PFD) and a multi-function display (MFD). The aircraft also integrates an instrumental flying simulation system.
 Introduction of new composites materials in some parts of the plane

Lasta 95P-2

It is a same version as the Lasta 95V-54 designated for export customers with possibility of slight differences at customer request.

Operators
Iraqi Air Force – 20 Lasta 95N (option for another 16)
Serbian Air Force – 14 Lasta 95V-54

Potential operators
Several countries are rumored to have expressed interest in acquiring Lasta trainer aircraft:
 Algerian Air Force
 National Air Force of Angola
 Libya Libyan Air Force

Specifications (Lasta 95N)

See also

References

External links

 Lasta 95 - Training aircraft

Lasta
1980s Yugoslav military trainer aircraft
Single-engined tractor aircraft
Low-wing aircraft
Military Technical Institute Belgrade
Serbian military trainer aircraft
Aircraft first flown in 1985